is a professional Japanese baseball player. He plays pitcher for the Tokyo Yakult Swallows. He is married to former AKB48 member Tomomi Itano.

References 

1997 births
Living people
Baseball people from Kyoto Prefecture
Japanese baseball players
Nippon Professional Baseball pitchers
Tokyo Yakult Swallows players
2023 World Baseball Classic players